San Luis Coastal Unified School District is a public school district in San Luis Obispo County, California, United States.

External links
 

School districts in San Luis Obispo County, California